The Lincoln Normal School, originally Lincoln School and later reorganized as State Normal School and University for the Education of Colored Teachers and Students, was a historic African American school expanded to include a normal school in Marion, Alabama. Founded less than two years after the end of the Civil War, it is one of the oldest HBCUs (historically black colleges and universities) in the United States.

History 
The school's roots go back to a Union Army soldier who remained in Marion after the end of the Civil War to teach newly freed African Americans. His efforts proved successful and in 1867 the school was incorporated with the support of African Americans from the surrounding Perry County.

Nine ex-slaves, Joey Pinch, Thomas Speed, Nickolas Dale, James Childs, Thomas Lee, John Freeman, Nathan Levert, David Harris, and Alexander H. Curtis, made up the first Board of Trustees.  Under their guidance, the black and white community of Marion raised five hundred dollars to buy land for the school's campus.  The money to build the school building came from the American Missionary Association (AMA).  
In 1868, school trustees sought the assistance of the American Missionary Association (AMA) for help with day-to-day operation of the school. The AMA supplied teachers and financial support.

In 1871, Alabama State Board of Education member Peyton Finley pushed for the school's expansion into a normal school and university.

Teacher training

In 1870, the school expanded to include teacher training and for a time became known as the Lincoln Normal University for Teachers. The program primarily focused on training African American high school graduates to become teachers. In 1885, Lincoln School was voted the top school for freed slaves in the south. On July 26, 1878, William Burns Paterson left Tullibody Academy to accept the Presidency of the State Normal School and University for Colored Students and Teachers in Marion, Alabama. In 1887 fire destroyed many of the campus buildings. As a result, the teacher training function was relocated to Montgomery where it became Alabama State University.

Faculty

The school was led by several principals, most notably Miss Mary Elizabeth Phillips. During her tenure from 1896 to 1927 both the campus and student body expanded. In 1939, alumni and friends constructed Phillips Memorial Auditorium in her honor.

Other notable faculty included Cecil and Fran Thomas who were instrumental in establishing a choral program at the school. Under their direction, choirs from the school toured across the Southeast and Midwest.

Legacy and reputation

Lincoln School became well known for graduating a high proportion of students who went on to attain advanced degrees, a remarkable achievement for any school but more particularly for a segregated high school in rural Alabama.

The school closed in 1970, when it was consolidated with the newly built and racially integrated Marion High School. One of the few buildings remaining on the campus site is the Phillips Memorial Auditorium, now on the National Register of Historic Places and the Alabama Register of Landmarks and Heritage.  The Lincoln High School Gymnasium was also added to the Alabama Register on February 29, 2005.

Notable alumni
 Coretta Scott King, civil rights activist and wife of Martin Luther King Jr.
 Edythe Scott Bagley, educator, and civil rights activist
 William R. Pettiford, Birmingham minister and banker
 Jean Childs, wife of civil rights activist Andrew Young
 Odith Thelma Patton, mother of Bishop T. D. Jakes

References

Further reading
 Lincoln Normal School tribute site
 Bailey, Richard. Neither Carpetbaggers Nor Scalawags: Black Officeholders during the Reconstruction of Alabama 1867–1878.
 Childs, Idella J. (1976) "Lincoln Normal School"
 History of the Baptists in Perry County
 Lincoln Normal School Scrapbooks, 1910s-1920s, The A. S. Williams III Americana Collection, University Libraries Division of Special Collections, The University of Alabama (digitized content)

School buildings on the National Register of Historic Places in Alabama
Defunct schools in Alabama
Defunct private universities and colleges in Alabama
Educational institutions established in 1867
Historically segregated African-American schools in Alabama
African-American history of Alabama
National Register of Historic Places in Perry County, Alabama
Neoclassical architecture in Alabama
Properties on the Alabama Register of Landmarks and Heritage
Schools in Perry County, Alabama
Marion, Alabama
1867 establishments in Alabama